Jules Vincent Radich (born ) is a New Zealand politician who has served as the 59th mayor of Dunedin, New Zealand since 2022. He has also served as councillor for the Dunedin City Council since 2019. Radich also serves as deputy Chair of Infrastructure and sits as a member on the Saddle Hill Community Board.

Early life and education 
Radich claims Scottish, Māori, Irish and Dalmatian ancestry.
Radich was born in Mataura, before moving to Dunedin to study a Bachelor of Science at the University of Otago. He taught science and physics.

Business career 
Radich started Uptown Motorcycles in Dunedin, and after 20 years, sold the company. Radich is a company director for Action Coach Otago and has been a business coach for 14 years.

Political career
Radich served his first term as a councillor on the Dunedin City Council (DCC) between 2019 and 2022. During the 2022 Dunedin mayoral election, he stood as a mayoral candidate on the Team Dunedin electoral ticket. During the election, Radich campaigned on reducing debt levels and restoring local confidence. On 8 October 2022, Radich defeated incumbent Mayor of Dunedin Aaron Hawkins. Following his election as mayor, Radich confirmed several policy positions including launching a review of the George Street revamp, retaining the city's one-way traffic system and investing in infrastructure to deal with stormwater inundation.

In mid October 2022, Radich appointed Sophie Baker as deputy mayor and chair of the Dunedin City Council's new strategy and engagement committee. In addition, he appointed Lee Vandervis, who had been previously overlooked for leadership roles, to the finance and council-controlled organisations committee. Radich retained Jim O'Malley as infrastructure services chairman. In allocating his appointments, Radich stated that his goal was to "create an environment where all councillors' skills and strengths are harnessed and their voices heard, and to lead a united council for the benefit of the city." Senior councillor and former Labour Member of Parliament David Benson-Pope and Labour councillor Steve Walker were not appointed to any committee chair or deputy chair roles.

In early November 2022, Radich expressed conditional support for the Government's controversial Three Waters reform programme but advocated more local ownership over water resources and infrastructure. While supporting national water regulation, Radich argued that the administration of water in the Otago and Southland Regions should be done at the regional level rather than through an entity covering the entire South Island. On 9 November, Radich and all DCC councillors with the exception of Vandervis voted to sign an updated agreement with the two local mana whenua (tribal groups) Kati Huirapa Rūnaka ki Puketeraki and Te Rūnanga ō Ōtākou. 

In mid-November, Radich attracted media attention after stating there was "no cause for alarm" after around 800 passengers aboard the cruise ship Majestic Princess tested positive for COVID-19. The Majestic Princess had visited several New Zealand locations including Dunedin before returning to Sydney on 13 November 2022. Radich claimed that there was no cause for alarm due to the measures taken by Dunedin health professionals and the high rate of COVID-19 vaccinations in Dunedin. He stated that his "main concern is about whether we can provide enough entertainment for those people on cruise ships." By contrast, University of Otago epidemiologist Michael Baker described the situation on Majestic Princess as a major outbreak and said that the cruise industry should have done more to limit infections and care for patients.

In December 2022, Radich was locked in a pay dispute with two fellow councillors Benson Pope and Steve Walker. Following his election in October 2022, Radich had proposed a new seven-committee structure with every councillor getting a role as a chair or deputy. Breaking with tradition, Radich had proposed paying councillors serving as chairs and deputy chairs more than councillors without additional responsibilities; with deputy chairs earning NZ$80,442 and other councillors earning NZ$64,353 per annum. Benson Pope and Walker claimed that Radich had offered them roles which he knew they would reject. In response to criticism, Radich rejected claims that his actions were political and claimed that they reflected the difference in work he expected from councillors holding additional responsibilities. In mid-December 2022, the Remuneration Authority rejected Radich's proposal to cut Benson Pope and Walker's salary by 11.7 percent on the grounds that it was unlawful. In mid-December, the DCC considered a revised proposal that would reduce the salaries of the deputy mayor and deputy chair by NZ$2,144 and NZ$2,460 while raising Walker and Benson-Pope's salary to $8430 each, bringing their annual remuneration to $72,783.

In December 2022, Radich initially supported Te Whatu Ora's (Health New Zealand) cutbacks to operating facilities at the new Dunedin Hospital. By January 2023, Radich had revised his position in the face of opposition from the public and fellow Dunedin City councillors including Benson-Pope to the proposed hospital rebuild cutbacks. Radich argued that opposing Health NZ's proposed hospital cutbacks could help improve public opinion ratings of the Dunedin City Council, which had declined to a record 25 percent low in 2022. In late January, Radich seconded Benson-Pope's motion urging the DCC to contribute NZ$130,400 for a public campaign to support the hospital rebuild project as it was outlined in the final business case. On 31 January, the DCC including Radich voted unanimously to support Benson-Pope's motion to fight changes to the Dunedin Hospital's design.

Personal life
Radich was a foundation member of the Orokonui Ecosanctuary. He is also a member of the Dunedin Art Society, Wine & Food Society, Investors Club, Underwater Hockey Club, Otago Motorcycle Club and Forest & Bird. Radich currently lives in St Clair, Dunedin.

References 

Year of birth missing (living people)
1950s births
Living people
21st-century New Zealand politicians
People from Mataura
Dunedin City Councillors
Mayors of Dunedin
University of Otago alumni